The St. Leo's Catholic Church in parish of the Roman Catholic Church in Lewistown, Montana, in the Diocese of Great Falls–Billings.

It is noted for its historic parish church, built in 1916. It was designed by architects Link & Haire and includes a  bell tower.  It was built by contractors Stanton & Smith. The church  was listed on the National Register of Historic Places in 1982.

References

External links
 

National Register of Historic Places in Fergus County, Montana
Romanesque Revival architecture in Montana
Roman Catholic churches completed in 1916
Roman Catholic Diocese of Great Falls–Billings
Churches on the National Register of Historic Places in Montana
1916 establishments in Montana
Roman Catholic churches in Montana